The  Campeonato Argentino de Rugby 2000  was won by the selection Buenos Aires that beat in the final the selection of Tucumàn
The 21 teams participating were divided on three levels: "Campeonato", "Ascenso", "Promocional".

Rugby Union in Argentina in 2000

National
 The Buenos Aires Champsionship was won by Atlético del Rosario
 The Cordoba Province Championship was won by La Tablada
 The North-East Championship was won by Tucumán RC

International
 In June Argentina beat Ireland in a test played in Buenos Aires.

 After, always in June, "the Pumas", visit for a four match tour. The lost both test matches (6-53 e 25-32). In November they played two matches in England, with a heavy loss against England
 
 Before the tour in England, Argentina hosted South Africa, losing the match 33-37.

 An "Argentina Development XV" won the South American Championship played in Montevideo

"Campeonato" 
Two pools of 4 teams. The top two to the semi-finals, third and fourth to the relegation play-out.

Pool A 

Standings

Pool B 

Standings

Semi-finals

Final

Play-out 

 Relegated: Santa Fè and San Juan

"Ascenso" 

Standings

"Promocional"

Pool A

Pool B 

Standings

External links 
  Memorias de la UAR 2000
  Francesco Volpe, Paolo Pacitti (Author), Rugby 2001, GTE Gruppo Editorale (2000)

Campeonato Argentino de Rugby
Argentina